Donald Marmen is Canadian former politician. He served in the Legislative Assembly of New Brunswick from 1984 to 1987 as a Progressive Conservative member from the constituency of Madawaska Centre.

References

Living people
Year of birth missing (living people)